Paul Litschi (born 2 January 1904, date of death unknown) was a Swiss cyclist. He competed in the individual road race at the 1928 Summer Olympics.

References

External links
 

1904 births
Year of death missing
Swiss male cyclists
Olympic cyclists of Switzerland
Cyclists at the 1928 Summer Olympics
People from Aarau
Sportspeople from Aargau